Elachista galactitella is a moth of the family Elachistidae. It is found in the Alps in Spain, France, Switzerland and Italy as well as Russia.

There is one generation per year.

The larvae feed on Stipa pennata. They mine the leaves of their host plant.

References

galactitella
Moths described in 1844
Moths of Europe